John Dickson (born November 18, 1945) is a former American Basketball Association (ABA) basketball player for the New Orleans Buccaneers. While playing at Arkansas State University, Dickson was named the Southland Conference Men's Basketball Player of the Year. In his one season in the ABA, he averaged 1.7 points per game and 1.6 rebounds per game.

References

1945 births
Living people
American men's basketball players
Arkansas State Red Wolves men's basketball players
Basketball players from Arkansas
Centers (basketball)
Chicago Bulls draft picks
New Orleans Buccaneers players